Oxyna maculata is a species of fruit fly in the family Tephritidae.

Distribution
France.

References

Tephritinae
Insects described in 1830
Diptera of Europe